Marvin Jones may refer to:

John Marvin Jones (1882–1976), known as Marvin Jones and J. Marvin Jones, United States congressman
Marvin Jones (linebacker) (born 1972), American football linebacker
Marvin Jones (wide receiver) (born 1990), American football wide receiver
Marvin Jones (basketball) (born 1993), American basketball player
Krondon (Marvin Jones III, born 1976), an American rapper and actor